Zuzana Kubalová (born 17 August 1988) is a Czech rhythmic gymnast.

She competed at the 2005 World Rhythmic Gymnastics Championships,

See also

 European Team Gymnastics Championships
 Gymnastics at the European Games
 List of notable rhythmic gymnasts
 List of medalists at the UEG European Cup Final
 List of Olympic medalists in gymnastics (women)
 List of Olympic medalists in rhythmic gymnastics
 Major achievements in gymnastics by nation
 Rhythm and dance
 Rhythmic Gymnastics European Championships
 Rhythmic Gymnastics World Cup 
 World Rhythmic Gymnastics Championships

References

Czech rhythmic gymnasts
1988 births
Living people
Place of birth missing (living people)